Wall's is a British ice cream and frozen dessert brand in the United Kingdom owned by Unilever and is part of the Heartbrand global frozen dessert brand. 

Wall's also owns the rights to the Mr. Whippy soft-serve ice cream mix.

History 

Wall's was founded in 1786 by Richard Wall, when he opened a butcher's stall in St James's Market, London. In the 1900s the business was led by Richard's grandson Thomas Wall II. Every year the company had to lay off staff in the summer as demand for its sausages, pies and meat fell, so in 1913 Thomas Wall II conceived the idea of making ice cream in the summer to avoid those lay-offs; the First World War meant that his idea was not implemented until 1922. Following his retirement in 1920, Thomas Wall II created his Trust for the "encouragement and assistance of educational work and social service". Today, the Trust continues to assist in these areas by providing grants to individuals and organisations.

By 1922 the business had been jointly bought by Lever Brothers and Margarine Unie.  Maxwell Holt was put in charge and he revived the idea of producing ice cream, with near instant success. Ice cream production commenced in 1922 at a factory in Acton, London. In 1959, Wall's doubled capacity by opening a purpose built ice cream factory in Gloucester, England.

There is a garage on the corner of Aultone Way and Angel Hill in Benhilton, Sutton, London, built in about 1913 and still in use today, which was originally used for the storing of the 'Stop Me and Buy One' bicycles of Thomas Wall's business.

Ice cream 

Unilever continues to use the brand for ice cream in the UK and it has become part of the company's international Heartbrand strategy, where it retains its local ice cream brand but shares one logo and most of the product's lineup with the various other Heartbrand brands across the world. Whilst remaining (2006) the market leader in the UK for individual hand-held products such as Cornetto and Magnum, and value-added multi-portion products designed to be eaten at home, such as Viennetta, the Wall's brand faces severe competition from the major supermarket brands and to a lesser extent from Nestlé (absorbing the Rowntree's and Lyons Maid brands) and Mars spin-off ice cream products.

In 2013, Wall's expanded into the UK confectionery market following a licensing deal with Kinnerton Confectionery, leading to the introduction of ambient chocolate bar variations for the Magnum, Cornetto and Mini Milk ice cream brands.

In 2017, Wall's created Magnum Ice Cream Tubs which are sold in shops.

The brand launched in Canada in 2022 with a range of Asian-inspired flavours including bubble tea and ube. These flavours are not actually available under the Wall's brand in the UK but are intended to leverage global recognition of the Heartbrand logo; Unilever uses the Breyers brand for its main range of ice cream products in Canada.

Around the world 

The same ice cream as Wall's is sold under different names around the world:

References

External links
 
Thomas Wall Trust

1922 establishments in England
Acton, London
Buildings and structures in the London Borough of Ealing
Companies based in Gloucester
Food manufacturers of the United Kingdom
Food processing in London
History of the London Borough of Ealing
History of Gloucester
Ice cream brands
Food and drink companies established in 1922
Unilever brands
British companies established in 1922
Brand name frozen desserts